The following is an episode list of the television sitcom One on One. The series aired on UPN from September 3, 2001 to May 15, 2006, with 113 episodes produced spanning five seasons.

Series overview

Episodes

Season 1 (2001–02)
Flex Washington, a successful Baltimore sports reporter and teenage father, let's his teenage daughter, Brianna move in with him after her mother is forced to move to Canada for work.

Season 2 (2002–03)
The lives and relationships of Flex, Breanna, and their friends are about to undergo significant change, but as usual, things don't always turn out as expected.

Season 3 (2003–04)
Breanna develops as an artist, but she still finds her love life to be as confusing as ever. Flex tries to address certain issues in order to move forward.

Season 4 (2004–05)
 This is Kelly Perine and Sicily Johnson's last season of the show.

Season 5 (2005–06)
 Jonathan Chase, Ray J. Norwood, Nicole Paggi and Camille Mana join the cast.
 Flex Alexander, Kelly Perine and Sicily Johnson are no longer part of the main cast.
 Flex Alexander makes a guest appearance in six episodes.

References

External links
 List of One on One episodes at the Internet Movie Database

Lists of American sitcom episodes